Max Hauke (born 29 August 1992) is a cross-country skier from Austria. He competed for Austria at the 2014 Winter Olympics in the cross-country skiing events.

During the FIS Nordic World Ski Championships 2019 he was apprehended during a raid by Austrian police and charged with doping offenses alongside his teammate Dominik Baldauf and three other athletes from Estonia and Kazakhstan.

Soon after, a video surfaced showing Hauke being caught red-handed by the Austrian police in the middle of a blood transfusion as part of the act of blood doping. The policeman, who leaked the video in the private group of an instant messaging app, subsequent to which the video spread on the Internet, was charged with malpractice. The unidentified officer may face up to three years in prison, if found guilty. In a lengthy interview to the Swedish newspaper Expressen, Hauke thought this to be the first such depiction in sports.

In July 2019, Hauke was handed a four-year ban by the Austrian Anti-Doping Commission (ÖADR).

World Cup results
All results are sourced from the International Ski Federation (FIS).

World Cup standings

References

External links
 
 

1992 births
Living people
Olympic cross-country skiers of Austria
Cross-country skiers at the 2014 Winter Olympics
Cross-country skiers at the 2018 Winter Olympics
Austrian male cross-country skiers
Austrian sportspeople in doping cases
Doping cases in cross-country skiing
Tour de Ski skiers
People from Liezen District
Sportspeople from Styria
21st-century Austrian people